Mbudya Island (or simply Mbudya) is an uninhabited island in Tanzania, north of the country's largest city, Dar es Salaam and is one of the four islands of the Dar es Salaam Marine Reserve (DMRS).

The island lies close to the beach resort and fishing community of Kunduchi and is reachable by means of a 20-minute motorboat ride crossing from the mainland. It is therefore a popular daytrip for both tourists and Tanzanian residents alike, serving as a location for a variety of leisure activities, including snorkelling, sunbathing and hiking.

See also
Tanzania Marine Parks and Reserves Unit
List of protected areas of Tanzania

References

External links

Geography of Dar es Salaam
Uninhabited islands of Tanzania